Razavi Khorasan Province (Ostân-e Xorâsân-e Razavi) is one of the 31 provinces of Iran, located in northeastern Iran. The city of Mashhad is the center and capital of the province. Razavi Khorasan is one of the three provinces that were created after the division of Khorasan province in 2004. In 2014 it was placed in Region 5 with Mashhad as the location of the region's secretariat.

At the time of the National Census of 2006, the province had a population of 5,515,980 in 1,426,187 households. The following census in 2011 counted 5,994,402 people in 1,716,314 households. At the latest census conducted in 2016, the population had risen to 6,434,501 in 1,938,703 households.

History

The Greater Khorasan has witnessed the rise and fall of many dynasties and governments in its territory throughout history. Various tribes of the Arabs, Turks, Kurds, Turkmens, and Mongols brought changes to the region time and time again.

Ancient geographers of Iran divided Iran ("Ērānshahr") into eight segments of which the most flourishing and largest was the territory of Greater Khorasan. Esfarayen, among other cities of the province, was one of the focal points for residence of the Aryan tribes after entering Iran.

The Parthian Empire was based near Merv in Khorasan for many years. During the Sassanid dynasty, the province was governed by a Spahbod (Lieutenant General) called "Padgošban" and four margraves, each commander of one of the four parts of the province.

Khorasan was divided into four parts during the Muslim conquest of Persia, each section being named after the four largest cities, Nishapur, Merv, Herat, and Balkh.

In the year 651, the army of the Rashidun Caliphate conquered Khorasan. The territory remained under the rule of the Abbasid Caliphate until 820, followed by the rule of the Iranian Tahirid dynasty until 873, and the Samanid dynasty in 900.

Mahmud of Ghazni conquered Khorasan in 994, and Tuğrul in the year 1037.

In 1507, Khorasan was occupied by the Uzbek tribes. After the death of Nader Shah in 1747, it was occupied by the Afghan Durrani Empire centered in Qandahar.

In 1824, Herat became independent for several years when the Afghan Empire was split between the Durranis and Barakzais. The Persians sieged the city in 1837, but the British assisted the Afghans in repelling them. In 1856, the Persians launched another invasion and briefly managed to recapture the city; it led directly to the Anglo-Persian War. In 1857 hostilities between the Persians and the British ended after the Treaty of Paris was signed, and the Persian troops withdrew from Herat. Afghanistan reconquered Herat in 1863 under Dost Muhammad Khan, two weeks before his death.

Khorasan was the largest province of Iran until it was divided into three provinces on 29 September 2004. The provinces approved by the parliament of Iran (on 18 May 2004) and the Council of Guardians (on 29 May 2004) were Khorasan-e Razavi, North Khorasan, and South Khorasan.

Archaeological sites 

Among the archeological sites discovered in this province:

Kohandezh hills 
Excavations conducted by an American team between 1935 and 1940 in Nishapur discovered museum-worthy objects, which were shared with the government of the Shah. The Metropolitan Museum of Art's publications document its own Nishapur ceramics from those excavations. For half a century after 1945 the site of Nishapur was ransacked to feed the international market demand for early Islamic works of art. Nowadays, the Kohandezh hills reveal the remains from those excavations.

Shadiyakh
Shadiyakh was an important palace in old Nishapur up to the 7th century, and became more important and populated after that. The palace was completely ruined in the 13th century. It was the home of notables such as Farid al-Din Attar, whose tomb is found in Shadiyakh.

Administrative divisions

Cities 

According to the 2016 census, 4,700,924 people (over 73% of the population of Razavi Khorasan province) live in the following cities: Ahmadabad-e Sowlat 8,326 ,Anabad 6,186, Bajestan 11,741, Bajgiran 594, Bakharz 9,044, Bar 3,765, Bardaskan 28,233, Bayg 3,545, Bidokht 5,501, Chapeshlu 2,374, Chekneh 1,381, Chenaran 53,879, Dargaz 36,762, Darrud 5,717, Davarzan 2,744, Dowlatabad 9,329, Eshqabad 1,993, Farhadgerd 8,442, Fariman 39,515, Feyzabad 18,120, Firuzeh 5,884, Golbahar 36,877, Golmakan 8,373, Gonabad 40,773, Hemmatabad 1,274, Jangal 6,650, Joghatai 9,268, Kadkan 3,719, Kakhk 4,625, Kalat 7,687, Kariz 11,102, Kashmar 102,282, Khaf 33,189, Khalilabad 12,751, Kharv 13,535, Kondor 6,460, Lotfabad 1,865, Mashhad 2,987,323, Mashhad Rizeh 10,105, Mashhad Zhaman 13,861, Mazdavand 1,241, Molkabad 2,056, Nashtifan 9,176, Nasrabad 7,460, Neqab 14,783, Nilshahr 7,371, Nishapur 264,375, Now Khandan 2,634, Qadamgah 3,010, Qalandarabad 4,880, Qasemabad 5,145, Quchan 101,604, Razaviyeh 8,850, Rivash 5,687, Robat-e Sang 1,551, Roshtkhar 7,514, Rud Ab 4,028, Sabzevar 243,700, Salami 7,555, Salehabad 8,625, Sangan 12,443, Sarakhs 42,179, Sefid Sang 6,129, Shadmehr 3,825, Shahrabad 2,083, Shahr-e Zow 3,745, Shandiz 13,987, Sheshtomad 3,108, Soltanabad 5,932, Taybad 56,562, Torbat-e Heydarieh 140,019, Torbat-e Jam 100,449, Torqabeh 20,998, and Yunesi 3,426.

The following sorted table lists the most populous cities in Razavi Khorasan according to 2016 Census results announced by Statistical Center of Iran. After Mashhad, Nishapur, Sabzevar, and Torbat-e Heydarieh are the most populous cities of the province.

Culture

Attractions 
This province contains many historical and natural attractions, such as mineral water springs, small lakes, recreational areas, caves and protected regions, and various hiking areas.

Besides these, Khorasan encompasses numerous religious buildings and places of pilgrimage, including the shrine of Imam Reza, Goharshad mosque and many other mausoleums and Imamzadehs which attract visitors to this province.

The Cultural Heritage of Iran lists 1179 sites of historical and cultural significance in all three provinces of Khorasan.

Some of the popular attractions of Khorasan-e Razavi are:

Mashhad 
 Imam Reza Shrine
 Goharshad Mosque
 Tomb of Nader Shah
 Tomb of Khajeh Rabie
 Tomb of Ferdowsi
 Haruniyeh Dome

Nishapur 
 Mausoleum of Attar of Nishapur
 Mausoleum of Omar Khayyám
 Tomb of Kamal-ol-molk
 Tomb of Heydar Yaghma
 Shadiyakh
 Jameh Mosque of Nishapur

Sabzevar 
 Khosrogerd Minaret
 Pamenar Mosque, Sabzevar
 Jameh Mosque of Sabzevar
 Tomb of Hadi Sabzevari
 Tomb of Boghrat

Kashmar 
 Arg of Kashmar
 Tomb of Hassan Modarres
 Imamzadeh Seyed Morteza
 Imamzadeh Hamzeh, Kashmar
 Imamzadeh Mohammad
 Grave of Pir Quzhd
 Jameh Mosque of Kashmar
 Haj Soltan Religious School
 Haji Jalal Mosque
 Atashgah Manmade-Cave
 Atashgah Castle
 Kohneh Castle, Zendeh Jan
 Rig Castle
 Amin al-tojar Caravansarai
 Talaabad Watermill
 Yakhchāl of Kashmar

Khalilabad 
 Jameh Mosque of Khalilabad
 Kondor castle
 Kondor Ab anbars

Torbat-e Jam 
 Sheikh Ahmad-e Jami mausoleum complex

Gonabad 
 Forud castle
 Qanats of Gonabad
 Kūh-Zibad

Sarakhs 
 Ribat-i Sharaf
 Tomb of Baba Loghman

Bardaskan 
 Tomb of Abdolabad
 Aliabad Tower
 Firuzabad Tower
 Firuzabad area
 Seyyed Bagher Ab anbar
 Darone Cave
 Sir Cave
 Rahmanniyeh Castle
 Qal'eh Dokhtar, Khooshab
 Qal'eh Dokhtar, Doruneh

Bajestan 
 Jameh Mosque of Marandiz

Taybad 
 Abbasabad Complex Taybad
 Karat Minaret

Rivash 
 Qal'eh Dokhtar, Kuhsorkh
 Nameq Village
 Shahi Dam
 Gabar Hesar castle
 Baghdasht Peak
 Band-e Qara Bathhouse
 Natural Yakhchāl of Band-e Qara

Colleges and universities
 Asrar Institute of Higher Education
 Bahar Institute of Higher Education
 Comprehensive University of Applied and Practical Sciences, Khorasan
 Ferdowsi University of Mashhad
 Gonabad University of Medical Sciences
 Hakim-e Sabzevari University of Sabzevar
 Imam Reza University
 
 Islamic Azad University of Ghoochan
 Islamic Azad University of Gonabad
 Islamic Azad University of Mashhad
 Islamic Azad University of Neishabur
 Islamic Azad University of Sabzevar
 Islamic Azad University of Torbat e Jam
 Islamic Azad University of Torbat Heidariyeh
 Mashhad University of Medical Sciences
 
 Payame Noor University of Mashhad
 Sabzevar University of Medical Sciences
 Sadjad University of Technology
 Sport Sciences Research Institute of Iran

Gallery

See also
Greater Khorasan
Khorasan Province
South Khorasan Province
North Khorasan Province

References

External links

The text of the law for division of Khorasan into three provinces (in Persian)
Cultural Heritage Foundation of Khorasan
Khorasan-e Razavi Province cooprative office
Khorasan-e Razavi Province cooprative office (in Persian)
Khorasan-e Razavi Province Department of Education (in Persian)
Imam Reza Shrine Official website
Mashad Mayor's Office
Central Library of Astan Quds Razavi Official website

 
Provinces of Iran